Ring of Bright Water is a book by Gavin Maxwell about his life in a remote house in coastal Scotland where he kept several wild otters as pets.  First published in 1960, it became a best seller and is considered a literary masterpiece, eventually selling over two million copies. A fictionalised film of the same name was made from it and released in 1969.

Book

The book describes how Maxwell brought to England  a smooth-coated otter, from  the Marshes of Iraq (before Saddam Hussein drained them)

Maxwell named the otter Mijbil. He raised Mijbil at Camusfeàrna (the name Maxwell gave his house at Sandaig near Glenelg), on the west coast of Scotland. Maxwell took Mijbil to the London Zoological Society where it was determined that Mijbil belonged to a previously unknown subspecies, subsequently named after Maxwell: Lutrogale perspicillata maxwelli (or colloquially, "Maxwell's otter"). 

'"Into this bright, watery landscape Mij moved and took possession with a delight that communicated itself as clearly as any articulate speech could have done," he wrote. "The waterfall, the burn, the white beaches and the islands; his form became the familiar foreground to them all."'

The book's title was taken from a poem by Kathleen Raine, who claimed in her autobiography that Maxwell had been the love of her life. Her relationship with Maxwell deteriorated after 1956 when she indirectly caused the death of Mijbil.

Reception
A reviewer in the Sunday Herald described the book as having "inspired a generation of naturalists" and referred to it as a "classic account of man and wildlife". The review calls Ring of Bright Water  "one of the most popular wildlife books ever written", as over two million copies had been sold worldwide by 1999.

Legacy
Two sequels were published: The Rocks Remain (1963) and Raven Seek Thy Brother (1968), which were less idyllic than the first, chronicling accidents and misfortunes involving both the otters and Maxwell's life. All three books were republished as Ring of Bright Water: A Trilogy in 2011 by Nonpareil Books. The trilogy does not include the full text of the latter two volumes, but removes the tangential travel sections which take place outside Scotland.

References

British autobiographies
Science autobiographies
Books about Scotland